Kaukalniai ('the hill of kaukas', formerly) is a village in Kėdainiai district municipality, in Kaunas County, in central Lithuania. According to the 2011 census, the village had a population of 2 people. It is located 3 km from Surviliškis, by the regional road  Kėdainiai-Krekenava-Panevėžys.

Demography

References

Villages in Kaunas County
Kėdainiai District Municipality